Sankaranum Mohananum (English: Sankaran and Mohanan) is a 2011 Malayalam fantasy/comedy/drama film written and directed by T. V. Chandran. It stars Jayasurya, Meera Nandan and Rima Kallingal in the lead roles.  The film is about the strange incidents faced by Mohanakrishnan (Jayasurya) from the ghost of his dead brother Sankaran (also played by Jayasurya). It explores the realm of human relationships in a sensitive manner.  While on one hand, it explores the bond between two brothers, on the other, it also highlights the bitter-sweet relationship of a couple. It is regarded as the first mainstream film of T. V. Chandran, who is known for his well-crafted art house films. Jayasurya also dons  20 different appearances in the film.

The film was screened in the "Malayalam Cinema Today" section at the 16th International Film Festival of Kerala (IFFK), in Thiruvananthapuram, Kerala in 2011.

Plot
The film is a journey through the minds of Mohanakrishnan, a fashion photographer living in Kochi. He was earlier based in Mumbai, and is separated from his wife, Jyotsna Mathew, a model and an aspiring actress who lives in Mumbai with their child. His older brother Sankaran, is a school teacher in Malabar. Sankaran, in his early forties, marries a much younger woman named Rajalakshmi, but he dies of a snake bite the day after the wedding. The ghost of Shankaran haunts Mohanakrishnan from then on. Sankaran's undying love for his wife and also the lack of love in the life of his brother is the reason Sankaran haunts Mohanakrishnan. The ghost appears before Mohanakrishnan in various get-ups and what keeps Sankaran going is his eternal devotion toward his wife and brother. Certain strange happenings vex Rajalakshmi also, who seeks help from Sankaran. She doesn't know the ghost of her husband is behind all these strange incidents.

Cast

Production

Photoshoot of the film was done by popular photographer Mahadevan Thampi at 23 February 2011,
Then the Pooja function was held at the date of 26 February Jayasurya would have 20 makeovers for Sankaranum Mohananum being directed by T V Chandran. Perhaps in the history of films, very few actors have had so many makeovers within a single film. Sankaranum Mohananum is being filmed under the banner of Prakash Movietone and Ragam Movies.

Crew opinion
 T. V. Chandran says:

 Jayasurya says:

 Meera Nandan says:

Reception
The film met with negative reviews from critics. Veeyen of Nowrunning.com rated the film  and said: "The crossover of the director to commercial cinema, if at all it has been attempted, is a total disaster. As much as it remains a fantasy, there is absolutely nothing in the film that would confront your intellect, and there is plenty that would question your intelligence." Sify.com concluded its review saying, "Sankaranum Mohananum turns out to be a major disappointment from a noted director like T V Chandran. The film tests your patience in a big way and ends up as a colossal bore, no less. Sad!"

References

External links 
 
 Sankaranum Mohananum at Oneindia.in
 Sankaranum Mohananum at Nowrunning.com
 
 
 

2011 films
2010s Malayalam-language films
2010s fantasy comedy-drama films
Indian fantasy comedy-drama films
Films shot in Kochi
Films shot in Kozhikode
Films shot in Mumbai
Films directed by T. V. Chandran